Everything Is 4 is the fourth studio album by American singer Jason Derulo. It was released on May 29, 2015, by Beluga Heights Records and Warner Bros. Records. The lead single "Want to Want Me" which reached number one in six countries, was released on March 9, 2015. The album is a follow-up to Derulo's previous studio album, Tattoos (2013) in the international market and Talk Dirty (2014) in the United States.

Background
The first song produced for the album was the first single, "Want to Want Me", which Derulo made the lead single after listening it to with several friends. For the song "Painkiller", a duet featuring singer-sobgwriter Meghan Trainor, the singer revealed that he decided to include her on the song after meeting her backstage at a couple of shows. The collaboration with Stevie Wonder in "Broke" was born during a dinner at the White House.

Derulo explained the significance of the title saying: "It's called Everything is 4 because it's my fourth album, but there are also other meanings. All happens for a reason, everything is for my mom, everything is for my fans. Everything is for myself to prove that I can do it. Everything is for the future. I could go on, but in the end the meaning is "Everything happens for a reason". Then there is also the meaning of the number 4: a chair has four legs, a table even. They are also 4 seasons, representing change. So 4 is a number that follows us everywhere. 4 is symmetrical. Then, Everything is 4."

Singles
"Want to Want Me" was released on March 9, 2015, as the album's lead single. Commercially, it was a success, reaching top positions in Austria and the United Kingdom. The song debuted at number 45 on the Billboard Hot 100, with 50,000 copies sold, since then it has peaked at number 5. The song's music video premiered on March 23, 2015. As of June 2015, "Want to Want Me" has sold 1.1 million digital copies in the United States.

The album's second single "Cheyenne", was released on June 30. The song peaked at number 66 on the Billboard Hot 100.

"Try Me" was released in October 2015 as the album's third single outside of the United States. It reached the top 5 in Norway and Poland, and was certified 2× Platinum in Norway.

"Get Ugly" was released in December 2015 as the album's fourth and final single. It was certified Gold in the US and Silver in the UK.

Critical reception

On Metacritic, which assigns a weighted mean rating out of 100 to reviews from music critics, Everything Is 4 received an average score of 67, indicating "generally favorable reviews", based on 9 reviews.

Commercial performance
Everything Is 4 became Derulo's highest-charting album on the US Billboard 200, where it debuted at number four and sold 22,000 copies in its first week. The album also debuted at number ten on the Canadian Albums Chart, with 2,500 copies sold. In its second week of release, the album dropped drastically to number 23 on the chart, selling 6,000 more copies. In its third week, the album dropped to number 39 on the chart, selling an additional 4,000 copies. In its fourth week, the album dropped to number 43 on the chart, selling 3,000 copies. As of June 2016, the album had sold 80,000 copies.

Track listing

Charts

Weekly charts

Year-end charts

Certifications

Release history

References

External links
 Official website

2015 albums
Jason Derulo albums
Warner Records albums
Albums produced by Oak Felder
Albums produced by Ian Kirkpatrick (record producer)
Albums produced by Ricky Reed
Albums produced by Mr. Collipark
Albums produced by Hitmaka
Albums produced by Danja (record producer)
Albums produced by Johan Carlsson